Authentic Entertainment, LLC is a Burbank-based reality television company that has produced television series that cover a wide range of subjects (e.g. Ace of Cakes, Weird Travels, Toddlers & Tiaras, All on the Line, Surprise Homecoming, Flipping Out, The Best Thing I Ever Ate, Auction Kings, Off Limits, Here Comes Honey Boo Boo), and most recently Cheer Perfection and Is Your Dog A Genius? and air on multiple networks, including Bravo, the Food Network, TLC, and the Discovery Channel. Authentic produces about 200 hours of programming a year. Endemol has been the majority owner of Authentic Entertainment since 2010.

History
Authentic Entertainment was founded in 2000 by Lauren Lexton and Tom Rogan, who were familiar with each other in their work as freelance reality production staffers.

In 2010-08-10, Endemol B.V. announced the acquisition of a majority share of Authentic Entertainment Inc. by Endemol North America, with unverified reports claiming the deal worth US$60–70 million.

Marketing
Authentic is represented by the Creative Artists Agency.

Awards
Authentic has been named to Realscreen magazine's "Global 100" list for six consecutive years, starting in 2007, and continuing in 2008, 2009, 2010, 2011, and 2012.

Four of their shows' episodes have received CINE Golden Eagle awards: Ace of Cakes, Toddles & Tiaras, and The Best Thing I Ever Ate in 2010, and Flipping Out in 2008.

Productions
Sources: 

Weird Travels
Weddings Away
Weddings Altered
Travel Channel Secrets
The Running of the Brides
The Other Nostradamus
The 750 Pound Man
Scene of the Crime
Reasonable Doubt
My Husband's Three Wives
Losing It: Tales From Fat Camp
Incredibly Small
Help I'm A Hoarder
Haunted Hotels
Ghost Moms
Destination USA
Clinically Wild Alaska
Christmas: Behind The Tradition
Christmas Specials (Crazy for Christmas, Dazzling Holiday Lights, Christmas Fun in the Sun)
Beyond The Bull
Beach Eats
Will Work For Food
The Sun
Pop School
Night (TV series)
Lock 'N Load
g word
Cities of the Underworld
Mysterious Journeys
Science Of The Movies
The Unpoppables
Traveler's Guide to Life
Best Places I've Ever Been: Disney Memories
Track Me If You Can
You're Wearing That?!?
Surprise Homecoming with Billy Ray Cyrus
Amsale Girls
The Originals with Emeril
Howe and Howe Tech
High Stakes Sweepers
10 Things that Make Me Happy
Out of Character with Krista Smith
Sugar High
Ludo Bites America
All About The Food
Raising Fame
Family Beef
LA Sugar
Big Mama's Kitchen
Bidding War
The Next Game Boss
Geek Love
Living Country
How Human Are You?
Interior Therapy with Jeff Lewis
Off Limits
The Best Thing I Ever Made
Flipping the Block
Jersey Belle
You Can't Lick Your Elbow
My First home
Is Your Dog A Genius?
Cheer Perfection
White Collar Brawlers
Auction Kings
It Takes a Church
All on the Line with Joe Zee
Duff Till Dawn
Waterfront House Hunting
Guilty Pleasures
Top 5 Restaurants
Ace of Cakes
Toddlers & Tiaras
The Best Thing I Ever Ate
Flipping Out
Knife Fight
Vacation Home Search
Christmas Show
The Poor Bastard
Food Firsts
His & Hers
Paradise Found
Married Like a Movie Star
Growing Up Hollywood
Venom Hunters
Trip Testers
Star Plates
Smartest Guy In The Room
Cake Masters
Here Comes Honey Boo Boo
The Perfect Fit
Breaking Bass
Trading Spaces
Listing Impossible

References

External links

Endemol
Banijay
Television companies of the United States
Companies based in Los Angeles County, California
Mass media companies established in 2000